Actinorhizal plants  are a group of angiosperms characterized by their ability to form a symbiosis with the nitrogen fixing actinomycetota Frankia. This association leads to the formation of nitrogen-fixing root nodules.

Classification
Actinorhizal plants are dicotyledons distributed among three angiosperm orders, 8 families and 25 genera:

These three orders form a single clade within the Rosids, which is a sister taxon to the other major nitrogen-fixing order, the Fabales. All actinorhizal species are trees or shrubs, except for the genus Datisca.
Many are common plants in temperate regions like alder, bayberry, sweetfern, Avens, mountain misery and Coriaria. Some Elaeagnus species and Sea-buckthorns produce edible fruit. In tropical regions, Casuarinas are widely cultivated.

Distribution and ecology

Actinorhizal plants are found on all continents except for Antarctica. Their ability to form nitrogen-fixing nodules confers a selective advantage in poor soils. Most actinorhizal plants are therefore pioneer species that colonize young soils where available nitrogen is scarce, such as moraines, volcanic flows or sand dunes. Being among the first species to colonize these disturbed environments, actinorhizal shrubs and trees play a critical role, enriching the soil and enabling the establishment of other species in an ecological succession. Actinorhizal plants like alders are also common in the riparian forest.
Actinorhizal plants are the major contributors to nitrogen fixation in broad areas of the world, and are particularly important in temperate forest. The nitrogen fixation rate measured for some alder species is as high as 300 kg of N2/ha/year, close to the highest rate reported in legumes.

Evolutionary origin

No fossil records are available concerning nodules, but fossil pollen of plants similar to modern actinorhizal species has been found in sediments deposited 87 million years ago. The origin of the symbiotic association remains uncertain. The ability to associate with Frankia is a polyphyletic character and has probably evolved independently in different clades. Nevertheless, actinorhizal plants and Legumes, the two major nitrogen-fixing groups of plants share a relatively close ancestor, as they are all part of a clade within the rosids which is often called the nitrogen-fixing clade. This ancestor may have developed a "predisposition" to enter into symbiosis with nitrogen fixing bacteria and this led to the independent acquisition of symbiotic abilities by ancestors of the actinorhizal and Legume species. The genetic program used to establish the symbiosis has probably recruited elements of the arbuscular mycorrhizal symbioses, a much older and widely distributed symbiotic association between plants and fungi.

The symbiotic nodules
As in legumes, nodulation is favored by nitrogen deprivation and is inhibited by high nitrogen concentrations. Depending on the plant species, two mechanisms of infection have been described: The first is observed in  casuarinas or alders and is called root hair infection. In this case the infection begins with an intracellular infection of a root hair and is followed by the formation of a primitive symbiotic organ lacking any particular organization, a prenodule. The second mechanism of infection is called intercellular entry and is well described in Discaria species. In this case bacteria penetrate the root extracellularly, growing between epidermal cells then between cortical cells. Later on Frankia becomes intracellular but no prenodule is formed. In both cases the infection leads to cell divisions in the pericycle and the formation of a new organ consisting of several lobes anatomically similar to a lateral root. This organ is the actinorhizal nodule also called actinorhizae. Cortical cells of the nodule are invaded by Frankia filaments coming from the site of infection or the prenodule. Actinorhizal nodules have generally an indeterminate growth, new cells are therefore continually produced at the apex and successively become infected. Mature cells of the nodule are filled with bacterial filaments that actively fix nitrogen.
Little information is available concerning the mechanisms leading to nodulation. No equivalent of the rhizobial Nod factors have been found, but several genes known to participate in the formation and functioning of Legume nodules (coding for haemoglobin and other nodulins)  are also found in actinorhizal plants where they are supposed to play similar roles. The lack of genetic tools in Frankia and in actinorhizal species was the main factor explaining such a poor understating of this symbiosis,  but  the recent sequencing of 3 Frankia genomes and the development of RNAi and genomic tools in actinorhizal species should help to develop a far better understanding in the following years.

Notes

References

External links

 Frankia and Actinorhizal plant Website

Biogeochemical cycle
Cycle
Nitrogen cycle
Soil biology
Symbiosis